A tart is a baked dish consisting of a filling over a pastry base with an open top not covered with pastry. The pastry is usually shortcrust pastry; the filling may be sweet or savoury, though modern tarts are usually fruit-based, sometimes with custard. Tartlet refers to a miniature tart; an example would be egg tarts. The categories of "tart", "flan", "quiche", and "pie" overlap, with no sharp distinctions.

History 

The French word tarte can be translated to mean either pie or tart, as both are mainly the same with the exception of a pie usually covering the filling in pastry, while flans and tarts leave it open.

Tarts are thought to have either come from a tradition of layering food, or to be a product of Medieval pie making. Enriched dough (i.e. short crust) is thought to have been first commonly used in 1550, approximately 200 years after pies. In this period, they were viewed as high-cuisine, popular with nobility, in contrast to the view of a commoners pie. While originally savoury, with meat fillings, culinary tastes led to sweet tarts prevailing, filling tarts instead with fruit and custard. Early medieval tarts generally had meat fillings, but later ones were often based on fruit and custard.

An early tart was the Italian crostata, dating to at least the mid-15th century. It has been described as a "rustic free-form version of an open fruit tart".

Description 

Tarts are typically free-standing with firm pastry base consisting of dough, itself made of flour, thick filling, and perpendicular sides while pies may have softer pastry, looser filling, and sloped sides, necessitating service from the pie plate.

Varieties 
There are many types of tarts, with popular varieties including Treacle tart, meringue tart, tarte tatin and Bakewell tart. A jam tart uses jam in place of fresh fruit.

Tarte Tatin is an upside-down tart, of apples, other fruit, or onions.

Savoury tarts include quiche, a family of savoury tarts with a mostly custard filling; German Zwiebelkuchen 'onion tart', and Swiss cheese tart made from Gruyère.

Gallery

See also

 Butter tart
 Custard tart
 Gypsy tart
 List of baked goods
 List of desserts
 List of pies, tarts and flans
 Manchester tart
 Neenish tart
 Norman Tart
 Pop tart
 Treacle tart
 Hertzoggie
 Vlaai

Notes

References

External links